SpoCon is a full-spectrum science fiction and fantasy convention held annually in Spokane, Washington, USA.  SpoCon is a non-profit organization that supports literacy and the public schools through annual events and donations. SpoCon is a sister convention to MisCon (Missoula, Mont.), RadCon (Tri-Cities, Wash.) and Tactical Solutions (Spokane).

History
The first SpoCon was held in 2008 at Gonzaga University.  Attendance was far more than anticipated, in large part because the Guest of Honor was Timothy Zahn.

The second SpoCon, with the theme "Are You Fan Enough?", was held July 31 - August 2, 2009 at Gonzaga.

The third SpoCon, with the theme of "The Year Fans Make Contact," ( From 2001: A Space Odyssey ) was held July 30 to August 1, 2010.  The Guest of Honor was artist Michael Whelan.

The 2011 convention had "The Power of Fandom" as the theme and featured best-selling author Patricia Briggs as Guest of Honor. This was the first SpoCon to leave the college campus and make a new home in the Spokane Doubletree Hotel. It was held August 12–14, 2011 and drew record numbers of attendees.

In 2012, SpoCon changed from the traditional convention-committee style of leadership and operation to a business model, with the aim of creating a more efficient, forward-thinking and productive organization.

In 2016 SpoCon changed back from a business model to a 501c3 non profit organization and the convention-committee style of leadership was reinstated.

In 2017 SpoCon returned with a new convention committee and returned to the Doubletree Hotel.

The 2018 convention had "Shoot for the Stars" as the theme.

In 2019 the convention moved from the Spokane Doubletree Hotel to the Historic Davenport Hotel. The theme was "All Hail the Goblin King" with goblin-related programming and guests.

Location and dates

References

External links
SpoCon website

2008 establishments in Washington (state)
Culture of Spokane, Washington
Science fiction conventions in the United States
Fantasy conventions
Recurring events established in 2008